The 2009–10 season was Aberdeen's 96th successive season in the top flight of Scottish football, and their 98th season overall. Aberdeen competed in the Scottish Premier League, Scottish Cup, Scottish League Cup and UEFA Europa League during the 2009–10 season.

Season overview

Aberdeen started the new season under new management. On the last day of the 2008–09 it was announced that Jimmy Calderwood and his management team would leave after five years at the club. Aberdeen negotiated with fellow SPL club Motherwell for the release of their manager, Mark McGhee. McGhee had a successful spell at the club as a player, when the Dons' won the European Cup Winners' Cup in 1983. Along with his assistant Scott Leitch the pair would form Aberdeen's new management team.
In the summer, Aberdeen lost their captain, Scott Severin, who left to pursue a career in England with Championship club Watford. The club also parted ways with four other players; defender Lee Mair joined fellow SPL club St Mirren. Jamie Smith joined MLS side Colorado Rapids, goalkeeper Bertrand Bossu had his contract terminated by the club and he was signed up with English club Crewe Alexandra. The club also parted ways with Faroese youngster Rogvi Holm.
With the squad depleting, McGhee sought out to buy new players. McGhee tried to sign Benin international Réda Johnson, but the defender choose to move to English outfit Plymouth Argyle. McGhee did make his first signing, goalkeeper Stuart Nelson from Norwich City. Jerel Ifil, Davide Grassi and Maurice Ross joined from Swindon Town, Espanyol and Kocaelispor respectively.
Aberdeen became one of the first clubs to participate in the newly re-branded Europa League. Aberdeen were drawn against Czech opposition in Sigma Olomouc. It soon proved to be a tie to forget, as the Dons were humbled 5–1 at home, and 3–0 away, which resulted in an 8–1 aggregate score. Aberdeen were also knocked out early in the League Cup as well. After falling 2–0 down, goals from Michael Paton ensure that the cup tie against Dundee would go into extra time. Aberdeen lost the game 3–2.
Aberdeen started their League campaign with a 3–1 defeat to Celtic, but with wins against Hamilton, St Mirren, St Johnstone and a notable one against rivals Rangers have got Aberdeen's season back on track.

Transfers

Transfers
In Permanent

Loans in

Loans out

Out Permanent

Statistics

Current squad 
Updated 22 April 2010

Player statistics
Appearances for competitive matches only

|}

As of game played 1 May 2010

Most appearances

Source: above appearances and goals table

Top scorers

Awards

Clydesdale Bank Awards

Results and fixtures

Pre-season friendlies

Scottish Premier League

UEFA Europa League

Scottish League Cup

Scottish Cup

Competitions

Overall

SPL

Classification

Results summary

Results by round

League Positions

Results by opponent

Source: 2009–10 Scottish Premier League article

Club

Management

Other information

See also
 List of Aberdeen F.C. seasons

Notes

References

External links
 Aberdeen FC website

 BBC My Club page
 Aberdeen F.C. season 2009–10 at ESPN

Aberdeen F.C. seasons
Aberdeen